Pararchytas is a genus of flies in the family Tachinidae.

Species
P. apache Woodley, 1998
P. decisus (Walker, 1849)
P. hammondi Brooks, 1945

References

Tachininae
Tachinidae genera
Taxa named by Friedrich Moritz Brauer
Taxa named by Julius von Bergenstamm